Marvin Vettori (born September 20, 1993) is an Italian professional mixed martial artist. He currently competes in the Middleweight division in the Ultimate Fighting Championship (UFC). A professional since 2012, Vettori is a former Venator FC Welterweight Champion. As of November 15, 2022, he is #4 in the UFC middleweight rankings.

Background
The eldest of three siblings, Vettori was born in Trento, Italy. He was interested in martial arts at a young age, and started practicing kickboxing as his first real martial art around the age of 13. He was inspired to train mixed martial arts after watching fighters such as Fedor Emelianenko in PRIDE on TV when he was sixteen.

When he started out training MMA in Italy, Vettori went to six different gyms to get all the skills and training he needed, as in Italy, at that time, the sport was still growing and a proper MMA gym was hard to find. He moved to London in 2012 for two years to train MMA and later moved to the United States to train at Kings MMA.

Vettori trains six days per week and his typical training day would split into two sessions, one in the morning and one in the evening. He starts out his training at 10 am to train on his striking technique with his coach, Rafael Cordeiro, for an hour, followed by wrestling drills and cage work with the help of Mark Muñoz. The second session would be in the evening to work on either conditioning or BJJ training which usually would end at 10 p.m.

Vettori also has a clothing line coming up called 'Italian Dream Apparel'.

Mixed martial arts career

Early career
Vettori fought in the European circuit and amassed a record of 10–2 prior joining the UFC.

Ultimate Fighting Championship

2016
Vettori made his UFC debut on August 20, 2016 at UFC 202 against Alberto Emilliano Pereira. He tapped out Pereira via guillotine choke in round one.

Vettori next faced Antônio Carlos Júnior at UFC 207 on December 30, 2016. Both Vettori and Carlos Júnior committed eyepokes and received a warning each from the referee but no point was deducted. The fight lasted three rounds and Vettori lost via unanimous decision, with 29–28 scores across the board.

2017
Vettori faced Vitor Miranda on June 25, 2017 at UFC Fight Night: Chiesa vs. Lee. He won the fight by unanimous decision.

Vettori faced Omari Akhmedov on December 30 at UFC 219. The back-and-forth fight ended in a majority draw. One of the judges scored it 29–28 for Vettori, and the others viewed it as a 28–28 draw, with Akhmedov winning the first two rounds, but Vettori having a dominant 10–8 round in the third.

2018
Vettori's next fight was scheduled on April 14, 2018 against future champion Israel Adesanya at UFC on Fox 29. He lost the fight via a split decision, with two judges scoring the fight 29–28 for Adesanya, and the third judging it as 29–28 for Vettori.

2019
On April 23, 2019, it was reported that Vettori was suspended for 6 months as he tested positive for ostarine, a selective androgen receptor modulator, from an out-of-competition test conducted on August 24, 2018. The United States Anti-Doping Agency determined that the positive test was the result of a contaminated dietary supplement, and found no evidence of intentional use of the banned substance. He became eligible to fight again on February 24, 2019.

Vettori faced Cezar Ferreira on July 13, 2019 at UFC Fight Night 155. He won the fight via unanimous decision.

After the fight with Ferreira, Vettori signed a new contract with the UFC and was scheduled to face Andrew Sanchez on September 14, 2019 at UFC Fight Night 158, replacing injured David Branch.  However, it was reported that Sanchez was forced to pull from the event due to an eye infection, resulting in the cancellation of the bout. In turn, the pairing was left intact and eventually took place a month later at UFC Fight Night 161. Vettori won the fight via unanimous decision.

2020
Vettori was scheduled to face Darren Stewart on March 21, 2020 at UFC Fight Night: Woodley vs. Edwards. However, due to COVID-19 pandemic, the event was cancelled. Vettori was scheduled to meet Karl Roberson on April 25, 2020. However, on April 9, Dana White announced that this event was postponed. Instead Vettori was scheduled to face Karl Roberson on May 13, 2020 at UFC Fight Night: Smith vs. Teixeira. At the weigh-ins, Roberson weighed in at 187.5 pounds, 1.5 pounds over the middleweight non-title weight limit of 186 pounds. However, Roberson was removed from the fight due to rhabdomyolysis. The pair met on June 13, 2020 at UFC on ESPN: Eye vs. Calvillo. At the weigh-ins on June 12, Roberson once again missed weight, this time coming in at 190.5 pounds, 4.5 pounds over the non-title middleweight limit. The bout proceeded as a catchweight and Roberson was fined 30% of his purse. Vettori won the bout via first round submission. This win earned him the Performance of the Night award.

Vettori was briefly linked to a rematch with Omari Akhmedov for UFC 256 on December 12, 2020, but it was later announced Vettori was expected to face Ronaldo Souza at the event. Vettori instead faced Jack Hermansson on 5 December 2020 at UFC on ESPN 19, after Hermannson's original opponent Kevin Holland tested positive for COVID-19. He won the fight via unanimous decision. This fight earned him the Fight of the Night award.

2021
Vettori was scheduled to face Darren Till on April 10, 2021 at UFC on ABC 2. However, on March 30, Till announced that he was pulling out of the fight due to a broken collarbone. Till was replaced by Kevin Holland. Vettori won the fight against Holland by unanimous decision, after dominating him on the ground for the majority of the fight.

A rematch between Vettori and Israel Adesanya for the UFC Middleweight Championship took place on June 12, 2021, headlining UFC 263. Vettori lost the fight via unanimous decision.

Vettori faced Paulo Costa in a light heavyweight bout, after Costa could not make middleweight the week of the fight, on October 23, 2021 at UFC Fight Night 196. Vettori won the fight via unanimous decision. This win earned him Performance of the Night award.

2022 
Vettori was scheduled to face former middleweight champion Robert Whittaker on June 11, 2022 at UFC 275. However, Whittaker withdrew for unknown reasons. The pair was rescheduled to meet at UFC Fight Night 209 on September 3, 2022.  Vettori lost the fight via unanimous decision.

2023 
Vettori faced Roman Dolidze on March 18, 2023 at UFC 286. He won the fight via unanimous decision.

Championships and accomplishments

Mixed martial arts

Ultimate Fighting Championship
Performance of the Night (Two times) 
Fight of the Night (One time) 
Venator Fighting Championship
  VFC Welterweight Championship (One time)

Mixed martial arts record

|-
|
|align=center|19–6–1
|Roman Dolidze
|Decision (unanimous)
|UFC 286
|
|align=center|3
|align=center|5:00
|London, England
|
|-
|
|align=center|18–6–1
|Robert Whittaker
|Decision (unanimous)
|UFC Fight Night: Gane vs. Tuivasa
|
|align=center|3
|align=center|5:00
|Paris, France
|
|-
|Win
|align=center|18–5–1
|Paulo Costa
|Decision (unanimous)
|UFC Fight Night: Costa vs. Vettori
|
|align=center|5
|align=center|5:00
|Las Vegas, Nevada, United States
|
|-
|Loss
|align=center|17–5–1
|Israel Adesanya
|Decision (unanimous)	
|UFC 263
|
|align=center|5
|align=center|5:00
|Glendale, Arizona, United States
|
|-
|Win
|align=center|17–4–1
|Kevin Holland
|Decision (unanimous)
|UFC on ABC: Vettori vs. Holland
|
|align=center|5
|align=center|5:00
|Las Vegas, Nevada, United States
|
|-
|Win
|align=center|16–4–1
|Jack Hermansson
|Decision (unanimous)
|UFC on ESPN: Hermansson vs. Vettori
|
|align=center|5
|align=center|5:00
|Las Vegas, Nevada, United States
|
|-
|Win
|align=center|15–4–1
|Karl Roberson
|Submission (rear-naked choke)
|UFC on ESPN: Eye vs. Calvillo
|
|align=center|1
|align=center|4:17
|Las Vegas, Nevada, United States
|
|-
|Win
|align=center|14–4–1
|Andrew Sanchez
|Decision (unanimous)
|UFC Fight Night: Joanna vs. Waterson
|
|align=center|3
|align=center|5:00
|Tampa, Florida, United States
|
|-
|Win
|align=center|13–4–1
|Cezar Ferreira
|Decision (unanimous)
|UFC Fight Night: de Randamie vs. Ladd
|
|align=center|3
|align=center|5:00
|Sacramento, California, United States
|
|-
|Loss
|align=center|12–4–1
|Israel Adesanya
|Decision (split)
|UFC on Fox: Poirier vs. Gaethje
|
|align=center|3
|align=center|5:00
|Glendale, Arizona, United States
|
|-
|Draw
|align=center|
|Omari Akhmedov
|Draw (majority)
|UFC 219
|
|align=center|3
|align=center|5:00
|Las Vegas, Nevada, United States
|
|-
|Win
|align=center|12–3
|Vitor Miranda
|Decision (unanimous)
|UFC Fight Night: Chiesa vs. Lee
|
|align=center|3
|align=center|5:00
|Oklahoma City, Oklahoma, United States
|
|-
| Loss
| align=center|11–3
| Antônio Carlos Júnior
| Decision (unanimous)
| UFC 207
| 
| align=center|3
| align=center|5:00
| Las Vegas, Nevada, United States
|
|-
| Win
| align=center|11–2
| Alberto Uda
| Submission (guillotine choke)
| UFC 202
| 
| align=center|1
| align=center|4:30
| Las Vegas, Nevada, United States
|
|-
| Win
| align=center| 10–2
| Igor Araújo
| Submission (guillotine choke)
| Venator FC 3
| 
| align=center| 1
| align=center| 4:30
| Milan, Italy
|
|-
| Win
| align=center| 9–2
| Jack Mason
| KO (knee and punches)
| Venator FC 2
| 
| align=center| 1
| align=center| 1:46
| Rimini, Italy
|
|-
| Win
| align=center| 8–2
| Daniele Scatizzi
| Decision (unanimous)
| Venator FC 1
| 
| align=center| 3
| align=center| 5:00
| Bologna, Italy
|
|-
| Win
| align=center| 7–2
| Giorgio Pietrini
| Submission (guillotine choke)
| Venator FC: Guerrieri Italiani Semifinals
| 
| align=center| 1
| align=center| 2:18
| Bologna, Italy
|
|-
| Win
| align=center| 6–2
| Anderson da Silva Santos
| TKO (punches)
| Venator FC: Guerrieri Italiani Quarterfinals
| 
| align=center| 1
| align=center| 1:07
| Bologna, Italy
|
|-
| Loss
| align=center| 5–2
| Bill Beaumont
| Decision (unanimous)
| UCMMA 40
| 
| align=center| 3
| align=center| 5:00
| London, England
|
|-
| Win
| align=center| 5–1
| Giorgio Pietrini
| Submission (toe hold)
| Impera FC 3
| 
| align=center| 1
| align=center| 3:14
| Rome, Italy
|
|-
| Win
| align=center| 4–1
| Radovan Uskrt
| Submission (triangle choke)
| European MMA League 1
| 
| align=center| 1
| align=center| 1:49
| Zagreb, Croatia
|
|-
| Win
| align=center| 3–1
| Luca Ronchetti
| Submission (rear-naked choke)
| Impera FC 2
| 
| align=center| 1
| align=center| 4:07
| Rome, Italy
|
|-
| Win
| align=center| 2–1
| Matt Robinson
| Submission (rear-naked choke)
| UCMMA 37
| 
| align=center| 1
| align=center| 3:30
| London, England
|
|-
| Win
| align=center| 1–1
| Tom Richards
| Submission (rear-naked choke)
| UCMMA 35
| 
| align=center| 1
| align=center| 1:31
| London, England
|
|-
| Loss
| align=center| 0–1
| Alessandro Grandis
| Decision (unanimous)
| New Generation Tournament 6
| 
| align=center| 2
| align=center| 5:00
| Seveso, Italy
|
|-

See also
 List of current UFC fighters
 List of male mixed martial artists

References

External links
 
 
 

Living people
1993 births
Italian male mixed martial artists
Middleweight mixed martial artists
Mixed martial artists utilizing boxing
Mixed martial artists utilizing kickboxing
Mixed martial artists utilizing wrestling
Mixed martial artists utilizing Brazilian jiu-jitsu
Italian practitioners of Brazilian jiu-jitsu
Sportspeople from Trento
Doping cases in mixed martial arts
Ultimate Fighting Championship male fighters